Epilichen is a genus of lichenized fungi within the Rhizocarpaceae family.

References

External links
Epilichen at Index Fungorum

Rhizocarpaceae
Lichen genera